The 2002 SMU Mustangs football team represented Southern Methodist University (SMU) as a member the Western Athletic Conference (WAC) during the 2002 NCAA Division I-A football season. Led by first-year head coach Phil Bennett, the Mustangs compiled an overall record of 3–9 with a mark of 3–5 in conference play, tying for sixth place in the WAC.

Schedule

Roster

Team players drafted into the NFL

References

SMU
SMU Mustangs football seasons
SMU Mustangs football